Leroy Holmes may refer to:

 LeRoy Holmes (1913–1986), American songwriter, composer and record producer
 Leroy Holmes (baseball) (1914–1964), American Negro league shortstop